is a 500-capacity live music venue located in Sapporo, Japan. It opened in 1990 and has hosted artists such as Uriah Heep, Bad Religion, Impellitteri and Foo Fighters.

References

External links
 Official website 

Music venues in Japan
Buildings and structures in Sapporo
Music venues completed in 1990
1990 establishments in Japan